"Only When I Love" is a song co-written and recorded by American country music artist Holly Dunn.  It was released in August 1987 as the second single from the album Cornerstone.  The song reached #4 on the Billboard Hot Country Singles & Tracks chart.  It was written by Dunn, Tom Shapiro and Chris Waters.

Chart performance

References

1987 singles
1987 songs
Holly Dunn songs
Songs written by Tom Shapiro
Songs written by Chris Waters
Songs written by Holly Dunn
MTM Records singles
Song recordings produced by Tommy West (producer)